The 2018–19 OK Liga is the 50th season of the top-tier league of rink hockey in Spain. It started on 22 September 2018 and end on 1 June 2019.

Teams

League table

Results

Copa del Rey

The 2019 Copa del Rey was the 76th edition of the Spanish men's roller hockey cup. 

Barcelona Lassa defended successfully the title.

Draw
The draw was held at the Olympic Pavilion of Reus on 7 February 2019.

Bracket

Source: FEP.es

Supercopa de España

The 2018 Supercopa de España was the 15th edition of the Spanish men's roller hockey supercup, played on 15 and 16 September 2018 in Sant Sadurní d'Anoia.

It was played in a Final Four format between Noia Freixenet, who qualified as host team, Barcelona Lassa as league and cup champion, and Liceo and Reus Deportiu as second and third qualified of the previous season.

Barcelona Lassa, defending champion, lost the title in the last 10 seconds of the final against Liceo, that achieved their second Supercup ever.

Lower divisions

OK Liga Plata
The OK Liga Plata, until the previous season known as Primera División, is the second division of Spanish men's roller hockey.

OK Liga Bronce
The OK Liga Bronce is the new third tier, played with the best teams in the Regional leagues. For this first season, only the winners of the Catalan playoffs and four teams from the groups North and South each will be promoted to OK Liga Plata.

The two non-Catalan groups were composed by:
Group North: 3 teams from Galicia, 3 teams from Asturias and 2 teams from the Northern league
Group South: 4 teams from Madrid and 4 teams from the Southern league. However, the fourth team from the latest renounced to the OK Liga Bronce.

Catalan playoffs

Source: OKCat.cat

See also
2018–19 OK Liga Femenina

References

External links
Real Federación Española de Patinaje

OK Liga seasons
2019 in roller hockey
2018 in roller hockey
2019 in Spanish sport
2018 in Spanish sport